The black-billed cuckoo (Coccyzus erythropthalmus) is a New World species in the Cuculidae (cuckoo) family. The scientific name is from Ancient Greek. The genus name, kokkuzo, means to call like a common cuckoo, and erythropthalmus is from eruthros, "red" and ophthalmos, "eye".

It is very similar and overlaps in range with the closely related yellow-billed cuckoo. A distinguishing characteristic of family Cuculidae is laying eggs in the nests of other birds. Although many cuckoos are obligate brood parasites, C. erythropthalmus often incubate their own chicks.

Description

Adults have a long, graduated brown tail and a black, slightly downcurved bill. The head and upper parts are brown and the underparts are white. The feet are zygodactylous. Juveniles are drabber and may contain some rufous coloration on the wing. The adults have a narrow, red orbital ring while the juveniles' is yellow. Black-billed cuckoo chicks have white, sparsely-distributed, sheath-like down that contrasts heavily with their black skin. They also have complex, creamy-colored structures on their mouth and tongue, which may appear like warts or some type of parasitic infection however they are normal for the species.

Habitat
C. erythropthalmus may be found in a variety of habitats. They are most commonly found around the edges of mature deciduous or mixed forests and much less frequently in coniferous forests. They can also be found in much younger growth forests with a lot of shrubs and thickets. Wetlands with a lot of alder and willow are another prime location to see them. Lastly, they can also inhabit more open areas such as abandoned farmland, golf courses and residential parks. Whatever the habitat may be, they are usually quite well hidden and tend to stick to the edges of these habitats. The chosen habitat must also have a water source nearby such as a lake, river, marsh or pond. On their wintering grounds in South America, they can inhabit tropical rainforests, deciduous or semiopen woodlands as well as scrub forests.

Range
When breeding, the species is distributed in wooded areas across much of the United States, east of the Rockies. Their range just barely extends into North Carolina, Arkansas, Oklahoma and Tennessee. They are not present to the south of those states when breeding. They can also be found in southern regions of Alberta, Saskatchewan, Manitoba, Ontario and Quebec. They're also present in the maritime provinces of Prince Edward Island, eastern New Brunswick and western Nova Scotia. When migrating in spring and fall, they can also be seen in southern United States as well as all of Central America. They migrate to northwestern South America in the fall, where they will spend the winter. Although they are mainly an eastern North American species, there have been confirmed reports of them in British Columbia, Washington and California. The species is also a rare vagrant to western Europe and Greenland.

Behavior

Feeding

These birds forage in shrubs or trees. They mainly eat insects, especially tent caterpillars, but also some snails, eggs of other birds and berries. It is known to beat caterpillars against a branch before consuming them to remove some of the indigestible hairs. Remaining hairs accumulate in the stomach until the bird sheds the stomach lining and disgorges a pellet in a manner similar to owls.

Invasive spongy moths may also serve as an important food source for black-billed cuckoos. Most birds cannot consume spongy moth caterpillars because of their hair-like setae however, cuckoos can consume them because of their ability to shed their abdominal lining. During outbreak years of these insects, the abundance of black-billed cuckoos increased on Breeding Bird Survey (BBS) routes. This increase is not due to higher reproductive rate because then the black-billed cuckoo populations would only increase the next year. The abundance is higher because the cuckoos flock towards the outbreak areas. This is supported by the fact that cuckoo abundance is actually lower than average in the areas surrounding the outbreaks, suggesting a large influx of the birds towards outbreaks. They are able to find these areas due to post-migratory nomadic behavior. Once reaching their breeding ground, they search vast expanses of forest for the most suitable breeding area, in this case, where there is an abundance of food. Similar patterns have also been observed during outbreaks of tent caterpillars, fall webworms and cicadas.

Vocalization
When they are a couple days old, the chicks can make a buzzing sound that resembles an insect and a few days later, they can make a low barking call when disturbed. The call of this species is 2-5 sets of "coo" notes that are high-pitched, rapid and repetitive. There is a slight pause between each set. The phonetics are often written "coo-coo-coo-coo, coo-coo-coo-coo, coo-coo-coo-coo, ...". Adults usually call during the day when breeding however they begin calling at night, in the middle of summer.

Reproduction

Prior to copulation, the male lands on a branch near the female with an insect in its beak. The female will then flick her tail up and down intermittently for about 15 minutes while the male sits there motionless. The male then mounts the female, with the insect still in its mouth, and the two copulate. The male then either eats the food item or gives it to the female for her to eat.

Females usually lay 2-3 blue-green eggs, sometimes 4 or 5, which may take on a marbled appearance after a couple days of incubation. Adults incubate the eggs for 10–13 days. The young black-billed cuckoos, as well as others cuckoos in the genus Coccyzus, leave the nest 7–9 days after hatching, which is quite young when compared to other birds. The young are not able to fly right away however they can still move quite large distances by jumping between tree branches. During this period, they are more vulnerable to predators because they cannot fly away as the adults could. Due to this vulnerability, the juveniles can slowly assume an erect posture to conceal themselves. They stretch their neck out and point their bill upwards, while keeping their eyes open and remaining motionless. If the threat starts to back off, the cuckoo will relax its pose.

Outbreaks of tent caterpillars can have a positive effect on black-billed cuckoo populations. During these outbreaks, the adults begin laying eggs earlier in the season. They can also produce larger clutches and may even increase their parasitic activities.

Brood parasitism
However, in years with an abundance of food sources (such as outbreaks of periodical cicadas), the species may engage in brood parasitism. They can lay eggs in the nests of other black-billed cuckoos, called conspecific parasitism, or in the nests of other birds, known as interspecific parasitism. The females will usually parasitize nests in the afternoon because the nests are often unguarded at this time. This cuckoo species is thought to have a laying interval of about a day so if two eggs show up in a nest on the same day, you can rightfully assume that one is a parasitic egg.

Taxonomy
The black-billed cuckoo was originally placed in genus Cuculus. This genus comprises Old World cuckoos that are all obligate brood parasites. Upon further genetic testing, it was placed into genus Coccyzus that comprises nine species of New World cuckoos. The black-billed and yellow-billed cuckoos are the only two that migrate into North America while the other seven are permanent residents of either Central or South America. Even though these two cuckoos overlap in range, they are not sister taxa. This suggests that the two species invaded North America separately. Although family Cuculidae is monophyletic, the genus Coccyzus was found to be polyphyletic.

Conservation
Although the black-billed cuckoo is classified as Least Concern (LN) on the IUCN red list, its population is still on the decline. It faces many of the same challenges as many other North American songbirds. Pesticides are having a large effect on them because the chemicals are depleting their food resources. Other threats include the loss of habitat, especially in their wintering tropical habitats, as well as urbanization. As with other migratory birds, they frequently encounter large buildings on their migratory routes which they may collide with, resulting in death.

References

External links

 Black-billed Cuckoo Species Account - Cornell Lab of Ornithology
 Black-billed Cuckoo profile at eNature.com
Black-billed Cuckoo Fact File at ARKive.org
Black-billed Cuckoo at BirdWeb.org
 Black-billed Cuckoo - Coccyzus erythropthalmus - USGS Patuxent Bird Identification InfoCenter
 
 
 
 
 
 

black-billed cuckoo
Birds of North America
Birds of South America
black-billed cuckoo
Articles containing video clips
Taxa named by Alexander Wilson (ornithologist)